Aija may refer to:

Aija (given name), a Latvian feminine given name
Aija Province, Province in the Ancash Region of Peru
Aija District, District in the Ancash Region of Peru
Aija, Peru, A town in the Ancash Region of Peru
Aijā, a 2023 song by Sudden Lights set to represent Latvia in the Eurovision Song Contest 2023